Kerala state has four operational international airports as of 2019 and is the only Indian state to have four international airports along with Tamil Nadu. Kerala is also the only state with the closest proximity to multiple international/domestic airports in the country. All four international airports lie in very close proximity, which makes it easy for all the people in Kerala to access air travel. The state also has four defence airports that are widely used by the Indian Armed Forces. Airports in Kerala provide domestic transport, support tourism in Kerala and also serve the high number of expatriates belonging to the state. The presently operating airports in the state of Kerala are as follows:

Trivandrum International Airport in Shankumugham in state capital of Thiruvananthapuram district
Cochin International Airport in Nedumbassery in Ernakulam district
Calicut International Airport in Karipur in border of Malappuram and Kozhikode districts
Kannur International Airport in Mattanur in Kannur district

In 2016, the Government of Kerala sought sanction for its fifth international airport has confirmed Sabarimala International Airport but under construction The first airport was started in Quilon during the 1920s but ceased operation when an accident involving a training aircraft at the boundary of the aerodrome resulted in the death of the pilot and the trainee. There are two defence airports also situated in Kerala, each being operated by the Indian Navy and Indian Air Force.

References

 

Kerala
Airports